Sian Chiong Cheruet, known as Sian Chiong (born October 27, 1993) is a Cuban actor and singer.

Career 
Chiong was a member of a music group named "Los Angeles". At the end of 2010, they had the opportunity to record an album of their own production, entitled: Confession, marking their identity. In this album the songs were authored by the members themselves, who also arranged all the songs and had the help of various musicians. Months later, after his debut, his current international label ¨S.P. Latin Records¨, which launched the Album on the international market in June 2011.

In 2018 he participated in a Mexican telenovela Like playing the role of Alan. He later participated in El corazón nunca se equivoca and Súbete a mi moto (2020 TV series).

At the end of 2020 he was an antagonist in the telenovela 
La mexicana y el güero  with Itati Cantoral, Juan Soler, Luis Roberto Guzmán, Nora Salinas, Jacqueline Andere, Patricio Castillo, Julio Camejo, Gala Montes, Iran Castillo and Ferdinando Valencia.

Filmography

References

External links 
 
 

1993 births
Living people
Male actors from Havana
Cuban male film actors
Cuban male telenovela actors